The foreign relations of Sudan are generally in line with the Muslim Arab world, but are also based on Sudan's economic ties with the People's Republic of China and Russia.

Bilateral relations

Africa

Americas

Asia

Europe

African regional organizations 
Sudan is an active member of all pertinent African organizations and is a charter member of the Organization of African Unity (OAU), established in 1963 and headquartered in Addis Ababa. During most of its time as a member of the OAU, it used its membership to keep the OAU out of the civil war. Even so, in 1994, the OAU mandated that negotiations toward ending the civil war be undertaken. Sudan consistently made its presence known in the OAU and continued to do so in its successor forum, the African Union (AU), created in 2002. In contrast to its policy of keeping the OAU out of the war in the South, Sudan accepted 8,000 AU troops in troubled Darfur (see War in Darfur), concluding that it was preferable to have an AU peacekeeping mission than one from the United Nations. However, Sudan both limited the number of AU troops and confined their role to monitoring the situation rather than engaging in more proactive peacekeeping. In mid-2007, al-Bashir finally agreed to allow UN forces to join AU peacekeeping operations in Darfur. The crisis in Darfur prevented Sudan from taking its turn in 2006 to assume the chairmanship of the AU; most AU members wanted Sudan to make more progress in ending the Darfur conflict. Subsequent indictment by the International Criminal Court further complicated al-Bashir's situation, and the AU continued to pass over his name in selecting a chairman. 

Sudan is a charter member of Intergovernmental Authority on Development (IGAD), established in 1996 as the successor to an earlier regional grouping. The focus of IGAD in the early 2000s was regional cooperation among its seven member states. IGAD played a critical role in ending the war between Khartoum and the Sudan People's Liberation Movement/Sudan People's Liberation Army but otherwise was not effective in mediating regional conflicts because of serious differences among its members, especially Ethiopia and Eritrea. Sudan is a member of the Common Market for Eastern and Southern Africa (COMESA) and is one of 11 COMESA nations that had joined in a free-trade area and agreed to eliminate tariffs on goods originating in member countries. Sudan is a member of the economic union led by Libya known as the Community of Sahel-Saharan States. Sudan also belongs to the African Development Bank (ADB) and receives significant assistance from that organization. As of 2011, it had been in arrears to the ADB since 1995 but had begun making payments in order to pay down the debt. Sudan is an active member of the Nile Basin Initiative, which brought the riparian states together to discuss technical and political cooperation related to Nile water issues.

Multilateral relations

Arab and Islamic organizations 
Sudan joined the Arab League at independence in 1956 and used the organization over the years at every possible opportunity to support its policies. Following the outbreak of conflict in Darfur in 2003 and sharp criticism of its policies by Western countries, Sudan relied on strong support from the Arab League. The Arab League opposed sanctions against Sudan, and several members provided humanitarian aid to refugees fleeing the fighting. By the end of 2004, the Arab League joined the cease-fire monitoring committee for Darfur. Al-Bashir served as the Arab League chairman in 2006. Sudan joined the Organization of Islamic Cooperation (OIC) in 1969. It sought support in the organization for activities such as the reconstruction of war-ravaged South Sudan. Like the Arab League, the OIC supported Khartoum's actions in Darfur. Sudan is also a member of a number of other Arab or Islamic regional organizations, including the Arab Bank for Economic Development in Africa, the Arab Monetary Fund, and the Islamic Development Bank.

United Nations 
Sudan joined the United Nations in 1956, and its various institutions began almost immediately to assist Sudan. UN refugee assistance during Sudan's first civil war began in the early 1960s. In 1965 one of the South Sudanese exile organizations unsuccessfully demanded the intervention of the United Nations to end atrocities. Sudan experienced frequent criticism in UN bodies throughout the first civil war that ended in 1972. Khartoum showed great skill in using the United Nations in pursuit of its own interests. One example occurred in 1976, when Sudan accused Libya at the United Nations of supporting a failed coup attempt.

Because the country was engaged continuously in a civil war in the South until 2005 except for the period 1972–83, Sudan was the subject of many UN resolutions. The United Nations Children's Fund (UNICEF) and the World Food Programme created Operation Lifeline Sudan in 1989 to deal with the problems created in the South by drought and the civil war. The United Nations High Commissioner for Human Rights issued a series of reports critical of the human-rights situation in Sudan. The Security Council imposed sanctions on Sudan in May 1996 after Khartoum refused to extradite three Egyptians to Ethiopia for their alleged involvement in the attempted assassination of President Mubarak in Addis Ababa in 1995. The mild sanctions reduced the number and level of Sudanese diplomats stationed abroad. The Security Council, with the United States abstaining, removed these sanctions in August 2001. In 2005, the UN Security Council agreed to a travel ban and asset freeze on persons suspected of committing human-rights abuses in Darfur and in 2006 imposed sanctions against four Sudanese involved in Darfur atrocities. Much to the consternation of the United States, Sudan in 2004 filled an African regional seat on the United Nations Human Rights Commission. A UN commission investigating atrocities in Darfur concluded in 2005 that genocide had not occurred. It did find, however, that Khartoum and government-sponsored militias engaged in “widespread and systematic” abuse that might constitute crimes against humanity. By late 2010, the UN had two of its largest peacekeeping operations—UNMIS and UNAMID—in Sudan.

See also
List of diplomatic missions in Sudan
List of diplomatic missions of Sudan
Foreign trade of Sudan

References

External links
 3 July 2008
 UN SRSG for Sudan Praises Abyei Progress of 11 September 2008 
 Parties Deposit Abyei Arbitration Agreement and Designate Agents of 2 October 2008
 31 October 2008
 Norway's Contribution to the PCA Fund for North and South Sudan of 18 December 2008
 Sudan Applauds U.S. President Obama of 22 January 2009  and the White House
 the Abyei Tribunal's Schedule for the Written Pleadings and Oral Hearing
 Abyei Hearing Schedule, 18-23 April 2009
 Live Webstream
 Abyei Hearing Proceeds Following Expense Row of 17 April 2009
 Oral Hearing of Abyei Arbitration Begin on 18 April 2009 
  Anniversary of Comprehensive Peace Agreement Between North and South Sudan of 7 January 2009
 FCO
 Sudanese-U.S. Foreign Relations from the Dean Peter Krogh Foreign Affairs Digital Archives
 BBC of 9 January 2009